Bolu District (also: Merkez, meaning "central") is a district of the Bolu Province of Turkey. Its seat is the city of Bolu. Its area is 1,616 km2, and its population is 217,935 (2021).

Composition
There are two municipalities in Bolu District:
 Bolu
 Karacasu

There are 112 villages in Bolu District:

 Afşar
 Ağaçcılar
 Ahmetler
 Akçaalan
 Alıçören
 Aşağıçamlı
 Aşağıkuzören
 Avdan
 Aydıncık
 Bağışlar
 Bahçeköy
 Bakırlı
 Baltalı
 Banaz
 Belkaraağaç
 Berk
 Bozarmut
 Bünüş
 Bürnük
 Çampınar
 Çamyayla
 Çanakçılar
 Çatakören
 Çaygökpınar
 Çayırköy
 Çepni
 Çobankaya
 Çömlekçiler
 Çukurören
 Değirmenbeli
 Değirmenderesi
 Demirciler
 Dereceören
 Doğancı
 Elmalık
 Ericek
 Fasıl
 Gökpınar
 Gölcük
 Gölköy
 Gövem
 Güneyfelekettin
 Hamzabey
 Hıdırşeyhler
 Ilıcakınık
 Işıklar
 Kandamış
 Karamanlar
 Karca
 Ketenler
 Kındıra
 Kırha
 Kızılağıl
 Kolköy
 Köprücüler
 Kozlu
 Küplüce
 Kuzfındık
 Kuzörendağlı
 Kuzörenemirler
 Merkeşler
 Mesciler
 Mesciçele
 Muratlar
 Musluklar
 Müstakimler
 Nuhlar
 Oğulduruk
 Okçular
 Ömerler
 Örencik
 Pelitcik
 Pirahmetler
 Piroğlu
 Rüzgarlar
 Saççılar
 Saraycık
 Sazakkınık
 Sazakşeyhler
 Sebenardı
 Semerciler
 Sultan
 Sultanbey
 Susuzkınık
 Tarakçı
 Taşçılar
 Taşoluk
 Tatlar
 Tekkedere
 Tetemeçele
 Tokmaklar
 Topardıç
 Ulumescit
 Vakıfgeçitveren
 Yakabayat
 Yakuplar
 Yayladınlar
 Yazıören
 Yeniakçakavak
 Yeniçaydurt
 Yenicepınar
 Yenigeçitveren
 Yenigüney
 Yeniköy
 Yenipelitçik
 Yenisefa
 Yeşilçele
 Yeşilköy
 Yolçatı
 Yukarıçamlı
 Yumrukaya
 Yuva

References

Districts of Bolu Province